Longfellow, Alden & Harlow (later Alden & Harlow), of Boston, Massachusetts, and Pittsburgh, Pennsylvania, was the architectural firm of Alexander Wadsworth Longfellow Jr. (1854–1934), Frank Ellis Alden (1859–1908), and Alfred Branch Harlow (1857–1927). The firm, successors to H. H. Richardson, continued to provide structures in the Romanesque revival style established by Richardson that is often referred to as Richardsonian Romanesque.

Officially, the firm was Longfellow & Harlow from 1886 until March 1887, with Alden participating as its agent.  Then, it was Longfellow, Alden & Harlow, until 1896, when it became Alden & Harlow.  The split with Longfellow is described as amicable on page 62 of Margaret Henderson Floyd's book about the firm, and it had more to do with the fact that Longfellow was in Boston and Alden & Harlow had relocated to Pittsburgh and were managing their firm there due to the number of commissions they received.  After Alden died, Harlow practiced with different partners in Pittsburgh until his death.  Longfellow continued to practice in Boston until his death.

The architects Frederick G. Scheibler Jr., William L. Steele, and Henry M. Seaver trained in the firm's office. Howard K. Jones was the chief draftsman for the Alden & Harlow office. According to Floyd, "other young draftsmen in the office played roles that are still for the most part unknown". The best documented picture is for the firm's largest commission: the major Carnegie Institute expansion of 1899-1907. Here Jones played a key role, assisted by Steele, Richard Hooker, and John Henry Craner.

Selected commissions

Longfellow, Alden & Harlow
Music Building at the University of Pittsburgh (1884)
Sunnyledge (former McClelland House), 5124 Fifth Avenue in the Shadyside neighborhood of Pittsburgh, Pennsylvania (1886)
West End United Methodist Church, 621 Main Street in the Elliott neighborhood of Pittsburgh, PA (1887)
Duquesne Club, at 325 Sixth Avenue in downtown Pittsburgh, Pennsylvania (1887 to 1889; addition by Alden & Harlow in 1902)
Cambridge, Massachusetts City Hall, built in 1888 and 1889
Edwin Abbot House, Cambridge, Massachusetts (1889)
Brattle Hall, Cambridge, Massachusetts (1889)
First United Methodist Church, Parker Avenue at Library Street, Braddock, Pennsylvania (1889)
Joseph Horne House, 838 Lincoln Avenue in the Allegheny West neighborhood of Pittsburgh, PA (1889)
McKeesport National Bank, Fifth Avenue and Sinclair Street, McKeesport, Pennsylvania (1889 to 1891)
Theodore Parker Church, West Roxbury, Massachusetts (1890)
Frank Alden House, 617 Linden Avenue in the Point Breeze neighborhood of Pittsburgh, PA (1890)
Carnegie Institute and Carnegie Library of Pittsburgh in the Oakland neighborhood of Pittsburgh, PA (1892 to 1895; addition to Institute by Alden & Harlow from 1903 to 1907)
Hunnewell Building at Arnold Arboretum in Boston, Massachusetts (1892 to 1903)
J.A. Noyes House, Cambridge, Massachusetts (1894)
"Bagatelle" (James G. Pontefract House), Little Sewickley Creek Road, Edgeworth, Pennsylvania (1894)
"Red Gables" (Frank Alden House), 605 Maple Lane, Edgeworth, Pennsylvania (1894)
Carnegie Building (Pittsburgh), the first steel-framed building in Pittsburgh, PA (1895)
Garrison Foundry-Mackintosh Hemphill Company Offices, South Side Flats, Pittsburgh, PA (1895)

Alden & Harlow
Carnegie Library of Homestead, Munhall, Pennsylvania (1896)
The greenhouse and playhouse at the Frick Art & Historical Center, in the Point Breeze neighborhood of Pittsburgh, PA (1897)
Byers-Lyons House, in the Allegheny West neighborhood of Pittsburgh, PA (1898)
Lawrenceville Branch of the Carnegie Library of Pittsburgh (1898)
The Pittsburgh Golf Club, 5280 Northumberland Street in the Squirrel Hill neighborhood of Pittsburgh, PA (1899, enlarged 1904)
Carnegie Library of Steubenville, 407 S. 4th Street, Steubenville, Ohio (1899) Renovated (2018) Main Library, Public Library of Steubenville and Jefferson County
Mount Washington Branch of the Carnegie Library of Pittsburgh (1900)
Oakmont Carnegie Library, Allegheny River Boulevard, Oakmont, Pennsylvania (1901)
The Bank Tower (Peoples Savings Bank Building), at 307 Fourth Avenue in downtown Pittsburgh, Pennsylvania (1901 and 1902)
Western Pennsylvania School for the Deaf Administrative Building, Swissvale Avenue and Walnut Street in Edgewood, Pennsylvania (1903)
Bellefield Boiler Plant ("Cloud Factory"), built to provide steam for the Carnegie Institute, Pittsburgh, PA (1903 to 1907)
"Muottas" (William Walker House), Little Sewickley Creek Road, Edgeworth, Pennsylvania (1904)
Regal Shoe Company, at the corner of Market Street and Fifth Avenue (160 Fifth Avenue), downtown Pittsburgh, Pennsylvania (1908)
South Side Branch of the Carnegie Library of Pittsburgh (1909)
Homewood Branch of the Carnegie Library of Pittsburgh (1910)
Mellon Park gardens in the Point Breeze neighborhood of Pittsburgh, PA (1912)
Fox Chapel Golf Club, 426 Fox Chapel Road in Fox Chapel, Pennsylvania (1924 and 1925)

Longfellow, Alden & Harlow gallery

Alden & Harlow gallery

References

Defunct architecture firms based in Massachusetts
Defunct architecture firms based in Pennsylvania
Architects from Boston
Architects from Pittsburgh
American companies established in 1886
Design companies established in 1886
Design companies disestablished in 1896
1886 establishments in Massachusetts
1896 disestablishments in Pennsylvania
Richardsonian Romanesque architecture in Massachusetts
Richardsonian Romanesque architecture in Pennsylvania
Historicist architects